Taylor Ridge can refer to:

Taylor Ridge, a ridge in Antarctica
Taylor Ridge (Georgia), a ridge in the U.S. state of Georgia
Taylor Ridge, Illinois, an unincorporated community in Rock Island County, Illinois, United States